Valparai is a legislative assembly in Coimbatore district of Tamil Nadu, which includes the city, Valparai. Its State Assembly Constituency number is 124. It comes under Coimbatore Lok Sabha constituency. This seat is reserved for scheduled caste. Valparai assembly constituency was part of Pollachi Lok Sabha constituency. It is one of the 234 State Legislative Assembly Constituencies in Tamil Nadu, in India.

Members of the Legislative Assembly

Election results

2021

2016

2011

2006

2001

1996

1991

1989

1984

1980

1977

1971

1967

References 

 

Assembly constituencies of Tamil Nadu
Coimbatore district